This is a list of airlines operating under a Danish air operator's certificate.

Scheduled airlines

Charter airlines

Cargo airlines

See also
 List of airlines
 List of defunct airlines of Denmark
 List of airlines of Greenland

References

Denmark

Airlines